Italian 120 millimetre naval guns were standard main armament on Italian destroyers and were widely used on various other ships and coastal artillery. Variants of similar designs were built by Ansaldo, OTO, Vickers, Schneider, Canet and Armstrong. Older and shorter-barreled guns have different ballistics as noted below.

40-caliber Armstrong 1889 and 1891
These were British QF Mark I and III guns used as coastal artillery and as star shell guns aboard Littorio-class battleships.

50-calibre M1909
These guns formed the original secondary battery of Andrea Doria and Conte di Cavour-class battleships and were later used for coastal artillery.

45-caliber Armstrong 1918
These guns were developed from the older 40-calibre models and installed as coastal artillery and aboard troopships and armed merchant cruisers.

45-calibre Schneider-Canet-Armstrong 1918
These guns with a maximum elevation of 30°  were installed as coastal artillery and aboard auxiliary ships.

45-calibre Schneider-Canet-Armstrong 1918/19
This gun was a twin mounting of the 1918 gun with maximum elevation increased to 32° . These guns were the main armament of Leone class destroyers and the sloop Eritrea.

45-calibre Vickers Terni 1924
These guns were the main armament of Sauro-class destroyers.

27-calibre OTO 1924
These were the original deck guns aboard Ettore Fieramosca and Balilla-class submarines.

45-calibre OTO 1926
These guns were the OTO version of the Vickers Terni 1924 guns. Turbine-class destroyers were built with these guns as the main armament, and Sella-class destroyers were re-armed with these guns.

50-calibre Ansaldo 1926
These horizontal sliding breech block guns in 20-tonne common-cradle twin mountings with maximum elevation of 45°  were the main armament of Navigatori, Freccia and Folgore-class destroyers.

45-calibre OTO 1931
These 3.2-ton quick-firing guns with a horizontal sliding breech block were mounted aboard Ettore Fieramosca, Pietro Micca, Balilla-class and Calvi-class submarines.

50-calibre OTO 1931
These horizontal sliding breech block guns in common-cradle twin mountings with maximum elevation of 33°  were the main armament of Maestrale-class destroyers.

50-calibre OTO 1933
These horizontal sliding breech block guns in 34-tonne common-cradle twin turrets with maximum elevation of 42°  formed the secondary battery of the rebuilt Conte di Cavour-class battleships.

15-calibre OTO 1933 and 1934
These were star shell howitzers installed aboard Zara-class cruisers and Maestrale, Oriani and Soldati-class destroyers.

50-calibre OTO 1936
These horizontal sliding breech block guns in common-cradle twin mountings weighing 22.8 tonnes with maximum elevation of 35°  were the main armament of Oriani-class destroyers.

50-calibre Ansaldo 1936
These horizontal sliding breech block guns in common-cradle twin mountings weighing 21.6 tonnes with maximum elevation of 40°  were the main armament of some Soldati-class destroyers.

50-caliber Ansaldo 1937
These horizontal sliding breech block guns in common-cradle twin mountings weighing 21.6 tonnes with maximum elevation of 42°  were the main armament of other Soldati-class destroyers.

50-caliber Ansaldo 1940
These horizontal sliding breech block guns in 12-tonne single mounts with maximum elevation of 45°  replaced the star shell howitzer of Soldati-class destroyers Bombardiere, Camicia Nera, Carabiniere, Corsaro, Geniere, Lanciere, Legionario, and Mitragliere.

Sources

Naval guns of Italy
120 mm artillery